Charles Robert Harrison (July 3, 1868 – February 7, 1946) was a Canadian politician. He represented the riding of Nipissing in the House of Commons of Canada from 1917 to 1921. He was a Conservative member of Robert Borden's Unionist caucus.

Harrison, who was born in Frodingham, Lincolnshire, England, was a train conductor before entering politics.

He served only a single term, and was defeated by Edmond Lapierre in the 1921 election. He subsequently served a term in the Legislative Assembly of Ontario, representing the provincial electoral district of Nipissing from 1930 to 1934 as a member of the Conservatives.

External links
 
 

1868 births
1946 deaths
Unionist Party (Canada) MPs
Members of the House of Commons of Canada from Ontario
Progressive Conservative Party of Ontario MPPs
People from Nipissing District